James Robert Holland (born 15 May 1989) is an Australian football player who plays as a midfielder for Austria Wien in the Austrian Football Bundesliga.

Born in Newcastle, New South Wales, Holland played youth football at the New South Wales Institute of Sport before making his professional debut for Central Coast Mariners in 2006. He went on to play for the Australian Institute of Sport before spending two seasons with Newcastle Jets. He then moved to Europe, playing in the Netherlands, Germany and Austria, most notably for Austria Wien. In 2016, he returned to Australia to play for Adelaide United.

Holland debuted for the Australian national team in 2008. He has gone on to represent Australia over ten times, and was a member of the squad at the 2014 FIFA World Cup.

Club career
Holland captained the NSW Under-16 side at the 2005 Qantas National Talent Identification Championships in Parklea, a tournament the NSW team ultimately won. He was a 2007 AIS Football scholarship holder and was an influential player in their successful campaign in the Victorian Premier League.

Newcastle Jets
Holland made an A-League debut with the Newcastle Jets playing two games as a short-term injury replacement player. He scored a goal against Wellington Phoenix in his first game, making him the youngest player to score in the A-League.

In October 2007 he signed a full-time two-year professional contract with the Newcastle Jets, despite interest from his home town club and Newcastle's rivals the Central Coast Mariners. He had previously made three appearances for the Mariners on a short-term contract during the 2006 A-League Pre-Season Challenge Cup.

Holland was part of the Newcastle Jets team which won the 2008 A-League Grand Final against the Central Coast Mariners. He was involved in a controversy during second-half injury time when he handballed inside the penalty area. Referee Mark Shield failed to spot the handball and did not award a penalty. Holland later stated that he didn't feel the ball hit his arm and that it wasn't an "intentional" act.

AZ Alkmaar
On 11 January 2009, Dutch club AZ Alkmaar completed the signing of the Australian midfielder for $650,000 (€350,000) on a four-and-a-half year contract from the Newcastle Jets.  He had earlier successfully trialled at the club.

Sparta Rotterdam
On 19 January 2011, it was announced that Holland would be playing for Eerste Divisie club Sparta Rotterdam for the rest of the season.

Austria Wien

On 17 January 2012, it was announced Holland had signed a one-and-a-half year contract with Austrian Bundesliga club Austria Wien after successfully trialling with the club.

MSV Duisburg
Holland joined MSV Duisburg of the 2. Bundesliga for the 2015–16 season.

Adelaide United 
In September 2016, Holland signed a two-year contract with Adelaide United, returning to the A-League.
On 12 January 2017, Adelaide United's coach Guillermo Amor confirmed that Holland had exited Adelaide United to go to China.

Liaoning Whowin 
On 18 January 2017, it was confirmed that Holland had joined Chinese Super League club Liaoning Whowin alongside fellow Australian Robbie Kruse on a two-year deal.

In May 2017, both players terminated their contracts with Liaoning Whowin due to unpaid wages.

Return to Austria
Holland returned to Austria in June 2017 to play for newly promoted Bundesliga side LASK.

International career

James is an Australian Under-20 and Under-23 national team representative, a striker in this squad playing alongside Marko Jesic, Holland's good friend. He made his full debut for the Socceroos against Singapore in 2008, and was named in the squad to face Ghana on 23 May 2008. He played in the World Cup qualifier against China on 22 June 2008, and was substituted for David Williams.

He has since captained the Young Socceroos AFF U19 Championship after defeating Korea Republic 3–1 on penalties. James Holland was selected for the Young Socceroos Squad for the 2009 FIFA U-20 World Cup in Egypt, he was also named captain for the Young Socceroos. He scored a penalty in the first match against the Czech Republic in the 94th minute in the 2–1 loss, he had missed the first penalty but it was re-taken for infringement. He was selected as a member of Australia's 2014 FIFA World Cup squad in Brazil. Holland remained an unused substitute throughout the tournament.

Career statistics

Club

International

Honours
Newcastle Jets
 A-League: 2007–08Austria Wien Austrian Football Bundesliga: 2012–13Australia'''
 AFF U-19 Youth Championship: 2008

See also 
 List of Central Coast Mariners FC players
 List of Newcastle Jets FC players

References

External links

James Holland at Aussie Footballers
 
 
 
 

1989 births
Living people
Sportsmen from New South Wales
Australian expatriate soccer players
Australia under-20 international soccer players
Australia international soccer players
A-League Men players
2. Bundesliga players
Chinese Super League players
Central Coast Mariners FC players
AZ Alkmaar players
Sparta Rotterdam players
Newcastle Jets FC players
FK Austria Wien players
MSV Duisburg players
Adelaide United FC players
Liaoning F.C. players
LASK players
Expatriate footballers in the Netherlands
Expatriate footballers in Austria
Australian expatriate sportspeople in Germany
Expatriate footballers in Germany
Expatriate footballers in China
Australian expatriate sportspeople in China
Association football midfielders
Soccer players from Sydney
Australian Institute of Sport soccer players
New South Wales Institute of Sport alumni
Austrian Football Bundesliga players
2014 FIFA World Cup players
Australian soccer players